Millinocket Lake may refer to:

Millinocket Lake (Aroostook River), lake north of Baxter State Park, Maine
Millinocket Lake (Penobscot River), lake near Millinocket, Maine